Su Dabao is a Chinese performance sand artist. He performs sand painting on stage, adding Music and Lighting. He is a popular performance Sand artist in China.

References

Chinese contemporary artists
Living people
Year of birth missing (living people)
Place of birth missing (living people)